Bosmere and Claydon was a hundred of Suffolk, consisting of .

It is bounded on the south by the Borough of Ipswich and Samford Hundred, on the west by Cosford and Stow Hundreds on the north by Hartismere and Thredling Hundreds and on the east by Carlford Hundred. It falls in the Deaneries of Bosmere and Claydon in the Archdeaconry of Suffolk and Diocese of Norwich.

Its clay soil has long been associated with agriculture, and is suited to grain production. It is crossed by the River Gipping which becomes the River Orwell at Ipswich on becoming an estuary. Its main settlement is the town of Needham Market.

The hundred's name is taken from the parish of Claydon which falls within its bounds, and Bosmere, originally "Bosa's mere", a small lake near Needham Market in the grounds of Bosmere Hall.

Parishes

Bosmere and Claydon Hundred consisted of the following 33 parishes:

References

Hundreds of Suffolk